Diogo Simão is a village in Mé-Zóchi District, São Tomé and Príncipe. Its population is 600 (2012 census). It lies 1.5 km southwest of Bobo Forro and 2.5 km northeast of Trindade.

Population history

References

Populated places in Mé-Zóchi District